Roger t'Joncke (born 18 July 1945) is a Belgian sprint canoer who competed in the early 1970s. He was eliminated in the semifinals of the K-4 1000 m event at the 1972 Summer Olympics in Munich.

References
Sports-reference.com profile

1945 births
Belgian male canoeists
Canoeists at the 1972 Summer Olympics
Living people
Olympic canoeists of Belgium
Place of birth missing (living people)
20th-century Belgian people